Eduard Jacobson (10 November 1833 – 29 January 1897) was a German dramatist and physician.

Biography
Eduard Jacobson was born in Gross Strelitz, Silesia, to Jewish parents Dorothea and Rabbi Jacob Jacobson. He attended  in Oels from 1846 to 1850, and then until 1854 the grammar school in Ostrowo. From 1854 to 1858 he studied medicine at the University of Berlin, receiving his M.D. there in early 1859.

Jacobson's playwrighting career began in 1856 with the popular farces Bei Wasser und Brot and Faust und Gretchen, the latter of which appeared at the Kroll Theatre under the direction of Karl August Görner, starring  as Faust. The extraordinary acclaim he won with it determined him to devote himself exclusively to such literary activity. His farce 500,000 Teufel, for instance, played 300 times successively in Berlin.

In the United States, many of his plays were staged at the New York Stadt Theater and Thalia Theater.

Selected publications
 
 
 
  Music by Adolf Lang.
 
 
  Music by Adolf Lang.
  Music by August Conradi.
 
  Music by M. Conradi.
  Music by Gustav Michaelis.
 
 
 
  Music by Thuiskon Hauptner.
 
 
 
 
  Music by Gustav Lehnhardt.
  Music by C. and H. Schröder.
  Music by O. Lehnhardt.
  Music by August Conradi.
  Music by O. Lehnhardt.
  Music by Gustav Michaelis.
  Music by Gustav Michaelis.
 
 
 
  Music by H. Grau.
 
 
  Music by Franz Roth.
  Music by Gustav Michaelis.
 
  Music by Gustav Michaelis.

References
 

1833 births
1897 deaths
19th-century German dramatists and playwrights
19th-century German physicians
19th-century Jews
Humboldt University of Berlin alumni
Jewish dramatists and playwrights
Jewish physicians
People from Strzelce Opolskie
Silesian Jews